River Lethe is located 18 km (12 mi) west of Mount Katmai, Alaska Peninsula, and is the middle branch of the Ukak River.

The river was named in 1917 by R. F. Griggs, National Geographic Society; inspired by Lethe, the "river of forgetfulness" in the Hades of Greek mythology.

A dry channel on Mars (which could carry water or lava) is named Lethe Vallis after this river.

See also
List of Alaska rivers

References

Rivers of Lake and Peninsula Borough, Alaska
Lethe